{{Infobox television
| image                = Corazon Rebelde poster.jpg
| image_size = 250
| caption              =
| alt_name             = S.O.S Corazón rebelde
| genre                = Telenovela
| creator              = Cris Morena
| developer            = 
| writer               = 
| based_on             = Rebelde Way
| director             = 
| creative_director    = 
| starring             = Denise RosenthalAugusto SchusterLuciana EcheverríaIgnacio Garmendia
| theme_music_composer = 
| opentheme            = "Corazón rebelde" by CRZ
| endtheme             = 
| composer             = 
| country              = Chile
| language             = Spanish
| num_seasons          = 
| num_episodes         = 80
| executive_producer   = 
| producer             = 
| editor               = 
| location             = Santiago
| cinematography       = 
| camera               = 
| runtime              = 60 minutes
| company              = 
| distributor          = Canal 13
| channel              = Canal 13
| picture_format       = HDTV 1080i
| audio_format         = 
| first_aired          = 
| last_aired           = 
| preceded_by          = Cuenta conmigo
| followed_by          = Feroz
| related              = Rebelde Way (2002)RemixRebelde Way (2008)Rebelde (2011)Rebelde (2022) 
}}Corazón rebelde (English: Rebel Heart) is a Chilean telenovela produced and broadcast by Canal 13 from August 18 to December 16, 2009, starring Denise Rosenthal, Augusto Schuster, Luciana Echeverría and Ignacio Garmendia. It is based on the Argentine telenovela Rebelde Way''. It is the first Canal 13 television series recorded in high definition format (720p) that was transmitted in the ISDB-T test signal in Santiago.

Cast

Main cast 
Luciana Echeverría as María José "Cote" Colucci 
Ignacio Garmendia as Manuel Santander
Denise Rosenthal as Martina Valdivieso
Augusto Schuster as Pablo Bustamante

Supporting cast 
Magdalena Müller as Luna Fernández
José Manuel Palacios as Tomás Echenique
María Gracia Omegna as Pilar Ortuzar
Felipe Álvarez as Guido Lassen
Carolina Vargas as Maite Medina
Constanza Pozo as Francisca Valdés
Constanza Varela as Victoria "Vico" López
Samir Ubilla as Nicolás Hurtado
Francisco González as Marco Délano
Katty Kowaleczko as Sonia Rey
Fernando Kliche as Franco Colucci
Tomás Vidiella as Sergio Bustamante
Alex Zisis as Marcelo Ortuzar
Elvira Cristi as Gloria Soto
Nicolás Saavedra as Diego Mancilla
Aranzazú Yankovic as Josefina "Pepa" Hormazabal
Ignacia Baeza as Daniela Leyton
Erto Pantoja as Peter O´Ryan
Teresita Reyes as Sandra Murua
Javiera Ramos as Estela Bustamante
Teresa Munchmeyer as Hilda Correa
Alejandro Trejo as Raúl Santander
Mabel Farías as Carla Durán de Santander
Carolina Arregui as Marina Cáceres
Marcela Osorio as Mercedes Donoso
Luis Gnecco as director Rubén Iturra
Loreto Araya-Ayala as Claudia Jara
Guido Vecchiola as Mauro del Solar
Nicolás Brown as Rolo González
Verónica González as Guido's mother
Jaime Omeñaca as Nicolás Hurtado (father)
Loreto Moya as Anita, Nicolás' mother
Agustín Moya as Federico Valdivieso
Jaime Artus as David Campbell, Alto Santiago alumni
Gabriela Ernst as Carmen Iturra
Julio César Serrano as Darío
Emilio García as Guido's father
Francisco Celhay as Ricardo Valenzuela
Catalina González as Julieta Donoso
Guillermo Helo as Andrés
José Luis Cáceres as Joaquín del Real
Juan Carlos Cáceres as Carlós Velásquez
Shelton as Ernesto Villarte
Luis Eduardo Campos as Nachito
Kevin Vásquez as Key-B
Julio Jung Duvauchelle as the police officer

References

External links 
 

2009 Chilean television series debuts
2009 Chilean television series endings
2009 telenovelas
Chilean telenovelas
Canal 13 (Chilean TV channel) telenovelas
Spanish-language telenovelas
Television series about teenagers
Television shows set in Santiago